Harry Schaare (May 23, 1922 – April 9, 2008) was an American painter whose work has primarily served the book cover and magazine illustration markets.

Schaare was born in the Jamaica area of New York City. Early on he studied architecture at New York University. He was a pilot with the United States Army Air Forces during World War II. In 1947 he graduated from Pratt Institute.

He did illustrations for Boys Life, Sports Illustrated, Reader's Digest, Aviation Week and several other magazines. He was the artist for a broad array of book covers in a wide variety of genres.

In 1975, he got into western art galleries, and then in 1981, moved to Arizona to continue his art.

External links

Harry Schaare page on American Art Archives Web site

References

1922 births
2008 deaths
20th-century American painters
American male painters
21st-century American painters
United States Army Air Forces pilots of World War II
New York University alumni
Pratt Institute alumni
20th-century American male artists